Guaniguanico, also known as Cordillera de Guaniguanico, is a mountain range of western Cuba that spans from the centre-west of Pinar del Río Province to the western area of Artemisa Province. It is formed by the subranges of Sierra del Rosario and Sierra de los Órganos.

Etymology
Granberry and Vescelius (2004) suggest a Guanahatabey etymology for the name Guaniguanico, comparing it with wani-wani-ku 'hidden moon, moon-set' in the purportedly related Warao language of the Orinoco Delta.

Geography
The cordillera spans for a length of circa 160 km, from the town Guane, in the west of Pinar del Río Province, to the Alturas de Mariel, near Mariel, Artemisa Province. The two subranges composing it, Sierra de los Órganos (west) and Sierra del Rosario (east), are divided in the middle by the San Diego River (Río San Diego). The highest peak is the Pan de Guajaibón (699 m), located between the municipalities of Bahía Honda and La Palma. It represents a symbol of western Cuba.

Landmarks
The Guaniguanico includes the Viñales Valley, a natural reserve and World Heritage Site; and other landmarks as the waterfalls of Salto de Soroa, the nature reserve of Las Terrazas, and the protected area of Mil Cumbres.

See also
Geography of Cuba

References

External links

Mountain ranges of Cuba
Geography of Pinar del Río Province
Geography of Artemisa Province